Louis Joux (born 6 February 1888, date of death unknown) was a Belgian footballer. He played in two matches for the Belgium national football team from 1908 to 1910.

References

External links
 

1888 births
Year of death missing
Belgian footballers
Belgium international footballers
Place of birth missing
Association football midfielders